The Junkers G 24 was a German three-engine, all-metal low-wing monoplane passenger aircraft manufactured by Junkers from 1925. Junkers F 24 was the designation for single-engine versions of the same aircraft.

Design and development
The increased German air traffic in the 1920s led to a requirement for a larger passenger transport aircraft. The G 24 was an enlarged development of the F 13. It was originally designed by Ernst Zindel as a single-engine aircraft. Under the restrictions imposed on aircraft in Germany by the Treaty of Versailles, only low powered engines were allowed. So the Junkers company designed their large G24 airliner to be single-engined, but built it as a tri-motor. With three low powered engines the G24 could fly, but was not a viable airliner. The plan was to sell the tri-motors to airlines outside of Germany, who would then install a single, high-powered engine (e.g. 450 hp Napier Lion) on the nose, and simply remove the wing center-section plugs that carried the other two engines. However the Military Inter-Allied Commission of Control declared the G24 design to be a military type aircraft, and outlawed it. 
Junkers then resubmitted what was essentially the same design, but under a new designation: Junkers G23. The Allied Commission ultimately allowed Junkers to build the G23, even in the single engined version, because it was clearly an airline type. The plane was always marketed under the G24 designation. (This paragraph based on 'Wagner' pages 230–234)

Junkers continued to build the G24/G23 as a tri-motor, because the ruse to circumvent the Allied restrictions also had the benefit that the plane could fly, and even climb, with one engine out. In 1925 most airliners were single-engined, since one big engine will usually be more efficient than several small ones. Twin-engine types could not maintain altitude with an engine out, unless they were so overpowered that the airlines could not afford to operate them (similarly to how twinjets were impractical on long-range routes before 1980s, and how trijets were used instead). A tri-motor did not have to be so grossly overpowered, to be able to fly with one engine out.

On May 1, 1926 newly formed German airline Deutsche Luft Hansa started flying passengers on the route Berlin – Königsberg at night using G24 aircraft ('Wagner' page 232 'Seifert' page 376). This was the first time any airline, anywhere in the world, flew passengers at night. Previously airlines had flown only mail and freight after dark. If an engine failed, the pilot bailed out by parachute, since a forced landing in the dark is too dangerous. The Junkers G24 could carry passengers, since there would not be any forced landings. The G24s of Luft Hansa also had blind flying instruments and radio navigation (with the radio operator sitting in the passenger cabin, as there was no room in the open two seat cockpit).

The aircraft was manufactured in three main batches, with different engine alternatives. Between 1925 and 1929, at least 72 aircraft were manufactured, 26 of which went to Luft Hansa. The G 24 managed to set a number of aviation records involving pay loads. Fritz Horn flew 2,020 km (1,256 mi) with a payload of 1,000 kg (2,200 lb) on 14 h 23 min, having an average speed of 140 km/h (90 mph), setting a new world record.

On 24 July 1926, two G 24s became famous after having flown the 20,000 km (12,400 mi) route between Berlin and Peking in just 10 stops. This flight ended on 8 September. It was initially meant that they would fly all the way to Shanghai, but they were prevented by military conflicts. On 26 September 1926, the two aircraft landed again in Berlin. Later during the year, a trans-Euro-Asiatic line was created.

Luft Hansa, which operated the largest G 24 fleet in the world, decided to modify their G 24s to a single engine standard. The first modifications were done in March 1928. The wing was shortened and the center engine was replaced with a BMW VIU engine. Junkers called this aircraft F 24ko. A total of 11 G 24s were modified to F 24 standard between 1928 and 1930. By July 1933, most of these BMW-equipped F 24s were again modified with the new Jumo 4 and designated as F 24kay. Most of these F 24s remained in service at the beginning of World War II in 1939. Most of them were used by Luft Hansa as freighter aircraft.

The Soviet-German aircraft cooperation in the 1920s led to a Soviet request for a new bomber aircraft. Junkers then designed the Junkers Ju 25 as a twin-engine bomber. But the development of this aircraft was too expensive for Junkers, especially since there were some difficulties with his Russian partners. Junkers then advised his lead designers – Ernst Zindel and Hermann Pohlmann – to design a military derivate of the G 24. By November 1924, the new aircraft was ready, and given the designation G3S1 24 and it was a direct modification of the G 24ba. The aircraft was said to be an air ambulance. Junkers followed up this design with several reconnaissance designs e.g. the G1Sa 24 which was a modified G 24 with only a single engine. The next design, the G2sB 24 was also a bomber, directly derived from the G 24he. This aircraft had a new center wing section and a new nose section, to allow an open shooting area to the forward areas. Junkers decided to produce this design as the general military version of the G 24 and gave it the designation K 30 in 1926.

In 1926, the Finnish airline Aero O/Y acquired a Junkers G 24, which went into service on the Stockholm route. The aircraft was equipped with floats, but not skis, and so could be used in summer only. It remained in service until 1935.

A Swedish G 24 also participated in the rescue of the unfortunate Italian Umberto Nobile expedition to the North pole. This was the first time an aircraft had flown over the Arctic Sea without stops.

Military versions

Junkers offered the K 30 design to the Soviet forces, which ordered a total of 23 K 30s in 1925 and 1926. A production line for the military version K 30 was set up at A.B. Flygindustri at Limhamn in Sweden as the German aviation industry was prevented from building military aircraft in 1926. The parts for the K 30 aircraft were built at Dessau and then shipped to Limhamn, where A.B. Flygindustri built the K 30 under the designation R 42. Some of the R 42s were equipped with machine gun positions and bomb mountings. But several of the R 42s were also shipped without military equipment to Russia. These were later fitted with military equipment at Junkers' factory in Fili, Moscow. The R 42/K 30 was designated JuG-1 in the Soviet Union. They received five 7.62 mm (.30 in) machine guns and could carry a bomb load of 500 kg (1,100 lb). This version was used to rescue the expedition of downed balloonist General Umberto Nobile in 1928.

Six more R 42s were delivered to Chile during 1926 plus three K 30s to Spain and two K 30s to Yugoslavia until 1931. The Spanish and Yugoslavian aircraft were produced at Dessau. The K 30 was equipped with either wheels, skis or floats. With the successful conversion of the G 24 into the single-engine aircraft F 24, Junkers was also thinking about a single-engine K 30 in 1931. Like the F 24, this K30do was to be equipped with the Jumo 4 engine and was similar to the initial G1Sa 24. However, no single-engine K 30s were built.

Record flights with the G 24

1926
May 1 – Deutsche Luft Hansa starts the first passenger night flights from Berlin to Königsberg.
July 24 – The Peking expedition flight: A Luft Hansa expedition flew to Peking, a flight of over 20,000 km (12,400 mi). Two G 24s, the D-901 and D-903 participated

1927
April 1 – World distance record with 2,000 kg (4,410 lb) payload. Waldemar Roeder achieved a new world distance record with a G 24L with 2,000 kg (4,410 lb) payload with 1,013.18 km (629.56 mi) in 7 hours and 52 minutes.
April 4 – World distance record with 1,000 kg (2,200 lb) payload. Fritz Horn achieved a new distance record with a G 24L with 1,000 kg (2,200 lb) payload with 2,026.36 km (1,259.12 mi) in 14 hours and 23 minutes.
April 10 – World speed record with 2,000 kg (4,410 lb) payload over 500 km ( mi). Hermann Roeder achieved a new speed record with a G 24L with 2,000 kg (4,410 lb) payload over 500 km (310 mi) with 175.75 km/h (109.21 mph). During the same flight, the record for 2,000 kg (4,410 lb) over 100 km (60 mi) was also achieved with 179.24 km/h (111.37 mph)
June 1 – World speed record with 2,000 kg (4,410 lb) payload over 100 km (60 mi). The Junkers pilot Zimmermann achieved a new speed record with a G 24L with 2,000 kg (4,410 lb) payload over 100 km (60 mi) with 207.26 km/h (128.79 mph). The record flight was performed between the turning points at Dessau and Leipzig.
June 28 – World speed record. Zimmermann achieved the speed record with 1,000 kg (2,200 lb) payload with 209.115 km/h (129.938 mph)
August 4 – The South Atlantic expedition flight. A G 24h1e belonging to Severa took off from Norderney to the Azores from where it was planned to cross the North Atlantic as the first aircraft from East to West. But the operation had to be stopped due to a crash at the Azores.
August 6 – a K 30 seaplane performed FAI World Record Flights. Over a distance of 1,000 km (620 mi) and with a payload of 1,000 kg (2,200 lb), the K 30 reached a speed of 171 km/h (106 mph). The flight time of 10 h 42 min 45 sec was also a FAI Record, as well as the flight distance of 1,176 km (731 mi).

1928
June 23 – The Afghanistan expedition flight. One G 24 and two F 13 aircraft started an Afghanistan expedition flight

Accidents and incidents
On 6 November 1929, a Deutsche Luft Hansa Junkers G 24bi Oberschlesien (registration D-903) crashed after striking trees on a hill in Marden Park, Surrey, England, while attempting to return to Croydon Airport, London, in thick fog after taking off from Croydon for a flight to Amsterdam in the Netherlands. All four crew members and three of the four passengers died.
 On 7 February 1930, Chilean Air Force Junkers R-42 J6 ditched off Punta Arenas due to engine failure, killing three of six on board.
 On 7 November 1930, a Syndicato Condor Junkers G 24 (P-BAHA, named Potyguar) sank off Iguape, São Paulo, killing one of eight on board.
 On 31 August 1932, an AB Aerotransport Junkers G 24 (SE-AAE, named Svealand) crashed at Tubbingen, Netherlands while the crew was attempting a forced landing after the number three engine failed, killing both pilots.
 On 1 October 1938, a Syndicato Condor G.24ce (PP-CAB, Ypiranga) made an emergency landing at the port of Coruripe, with no fatalities. The aircraft was later scrapped.
 On 24 August 1939, a Deutsche Luft Hansa Junkers F.24 (D-ULIS, named Düsseldorf) force-landed at Glindow, Germany following an engine fire, killing both pilots. The aircraft was manufactured in 1925 as a three-engined G 24 and was converted to an F 24kay in December 1931 as a test bed for the Junkers Jumo 4 engine. In 1936 the aircraft was re-engined with a Daimler-Benz DB 600 V12 for test flights, and a DB 601 V12 in 1938 for 200 hours of test flying, and it was during one of these test flights that the engine caught fire, leading to the crash.

Variants
Data from:Hugo Junkers Pionier der Luftfahrt – Seine Flugzeuge, Junkers Aircraft & Engines 1913–1945
G 24 Prototype Powered by one  BMW IIIa  and two   Mercedes D.I engines in 1924.
G 24 Improved version with one  Junkers L2 (195 hp) and two  Mercedes D.IIIa engines in 1925
G 24a Powered by three  Junkers L2 engines, attachment on wings, smaller engine cowlings, sometimes also a   Junkers L5 as a central engine. Two aircraft destined for Italy were fitted with   Isotta Fraschini central engines.
G 24ba with three Junkers L2, strengthened attachments and engine mountings
G 24b1a seaplane version of the G 24ba for Aero O/Y
G 24bi with one Junkers L5 center engine and two L2 engines
G 24ce with three Junkers L5, enlarged wing attachment since 1926
G 24e with three Junkers L5
G 24de strengthened attachments, smaller engine cowlings
G 24fe enlarged center wing attachments
G 24ge further enlarged wing attachments
G 24g1e seaplane version of G 24ge, used for torpedo experiments
G 24gu  one  Junkers L5G central engine and two Junkers L5
G 24gn  Junkers L5 center engine with 310 kW (420 hp), one built
G 24he with modified wing, separate undercarriage, aerodynamic cockpit, 14 passengers
G 24h1e seaplane version of G 24he
G 24hu with three BMW Va engines, one built
G 24li modified G 24a/b with Junkers L5 center engine
G 24mai Two modified G 24e aircraft with a  Isotta Fraschini Asso 200 centre engine for Italy
G 24nao with three Rhone Jupiter engines, prototype for the K30
G 24L with three  Junkers L5G engines

F 24kae was a single test bench for DB 600/DB 601 engines.
F 24kai a single test bench for the Jumo 211 engine
F 24kau with BMW VIau
F 24kayTest bench for Jumo 4 in October 1933 (c/n 839), plus surviving Deutsche Luft Hansa F 24ko aircraft re-engined with Jumo 4 engines.
F 24ko with a single BMW VIU engine

G3 S1 24 a projected ambulance aircraft from 1924, three Junkers L2 engines
G1 Sa 24 a projected reconnaissance aircraft from 1924, single-engine
G2 Sb 24 a projected bomber aircraft with several three-engine approaches
K 30 military G 24 version of 1926
K 30b a fictitious Russian designation for the land version of the K 30 (not the official Junkers designation)
K 30c a fictitious Russian designation for the seaplane version of K 30 (not the official Junkers designation)
K 30do single-engine version of the K 30 of 1931, with a Jumo 4;not built
W 41 test bench for Fo 4 diesel engine in August 1928 (c/n 843)
TB-2 Soviet military designation for the K 30 (not the official Junkers designation)
YuG-1 designation for Fili military conversions of the K 30/R 42

Operators

 Afghan Air Force

 Ölag

 Syndicato Condor

 Chilean Air Force
 Aero O/Y

 Deutsche Luft Hansa Luftwaffe Condor SyndikatSCHA
Hellenic Air ForceAla LittoriaRegia AeronauticaTransadriatica''

Aerolot operated one Junkers G 23W floatplane in 1925, but returned it to the producer later the same year

Unión Aérea Española
CLASSA
LAPE
Spanish Republican Air Force

 AB Aerotransport

 Ad Astra Aero 
 Swissair

Aeroflot
 Soviet Air Force

 Yugoslav Royal Air Force

Specifications (G.24he)

See also

References

External links 

1920s German airliners
G 24
Trimotors
Low-wing aircraft
Aircraft first flown in 1924